Naxidia punctata is a moth in the family Geometridae. It is found in India and Taiwan.

The wingspan is 30–31 mm. Adults are dirty white.

References

Moths described in 1880
Larentiinae